Princess Aurora is a 2013 South Korean television series starring Jeon So-min, Oh Chang-seok, Seo Ha-joon, Park Yeong-gyu, Son Chang-min, Oh Dae-gyu, Kim Bo-yeon, Park Hae-mi, Kim Hye-eun, Lim Hyuk, and Kim Young-ran. The daily drama aired on MBC from May to December, 2013.

Plot
Oh Ro-Ra is a 25-year-old woman whose family owns Chunwang Foods. As the youngest child of a wealthy family, Ro-Ra is charming, confident, and materialistic. The series is centered around Ro-Ra salvaging the second marriage of her 50 year-old brother.

Cast

Aurora's family
Jeon So-min as Oh Ro-ra (Aurora)
Park Yeong-gyu as Oh Wang-sung
Son Chang-min as Oh Geum-sung
Oh Dae-gyu as Oh Soo-sung
Byun Hee-bong as Oh Dae-san
Seo Woo-rim as Sa Im-dang
Lee Sang-sook as Jang Yun-shil
Lee Ah-hyun as Lee Kang-sook
Lee Hyun-kyung as Kim Sun-mi
Kim Hee-jung as Eun-ha (cameo)

Controversy
During its run, Princess Aurora became a fixture in the entertainment news headlines for both its over-the-top (called makjang in Korean) storylines and behind-the-scenes troubles.

On the 39th episode, the characters Oh Geum-sung and Oh Soo-sung (older brothers of the female protagonist) suddenly left for the United States to visit their wives. This meant that they were essentially written off the show. The actors playing them, Son Chang-min and Oh Dae-gyu, complained to the network that they weren't informed in advance of this development, and neither were their agencies; everyone, including the drama crew, only found out when they received the script before the scenes were to be filmed. This was reportedly writer Im Sung-han's decision: the actors had previously expressed their concerns to her about the storytelling's direction. The Korean press used the term "cast kill" to refer to the tendency of Im's past dramas (such as Dear Heaven, Assorted Gems, New Tales of Gisaeng) to abruptly kill off characters. In terms of production logistics, the fired actors still received the agreed-upon fixed salary for the duration of the series, regardless of screen time. However, Im's move had possible legal ramifications, and she was criticized for unprofessionalism, since the actors signed on to the drama (and turned down other offers) with the expectation that their roles would be prominent.

As the show went on, Im wrote out more actors (more than 12 in total), resulting in a reportedly deteriorating atmosphere on set and notoriety in the press. With some characters killed off unceremoniously, viewers dubbed the series "Im Sung-han's Death Note," culminating in the death of male protagonist Hwang Ma-ma (played by Oh Chang-seok). Dissatisfaction with Im mounted when it became known that one of the cast members, Baek Ok-dam, is her niece. Netizens charged Im with nepotism when Baek's role was expanded in the wake of the firing of other cast members.

Princess Aurora also received warnings from the Korea Communications Standards Commissions, which cited the drama's "multiple immoral storylines and crude language" as violations of its standards. It was sanctioned for material unsuitable for younger audiences, since it aired during the early evening at 19:15.

As ratings continued to climb, the initially 120-episode drama received a 30-episode extension, bringing its final episode count to 150. However, Im asked for 50 additional episodes (in order to bring up the final count to 200), stating that she needed the additional time to flesh out her storylines. Calling the series "an insult to viewers' intelligence," viewers then organized a petition to protest the extension and demanded that Im be fired from the show. MBC eventually decided to end the series at 150 episodes, but retained Im as writer (although the network demanded rewrites of the final two episodes). On December 11, 2013, Im posted a message on the show's website, "thanking netizens and reporters for their constancy in pointing out her flaws, and hoped that they would once again note her failings."

Awards and nominations

References

External links
Princess Aurora official MBC website 
Princess Aurora at MBC Global Media

MBC TV television dramas
2013 South Korean television series debuts
2013 South Korean television series endings
Korean-language television shows
South Korean romance television series
South Korean comedy television series
Television series by IHQ (company)